Renee Poussaint (August 12, 1944 – March 4, 2022) was an Emmy Award winning American broadcast journalist and educator known for reporting and advocacy related to Black history.

Early life and education
Poussaint was born on August 12, 1944, in Manhattan and grew up in Spanish Harlem. Following her parents divorce, she was raised primarily by her mother and family who emphasized the importance of education. Her uncle, Alvin Francis Poussaint, is a psychiatrist who consulted on The Cosby Show. Poussaint graduated from Sarah Lawrence College in 1964 with a B.A. in English literature and completed an M.A. in African studies at UCLA in 1970. During her undergradate studies she also took courses at Yale Law School and Sorbonne University in Paris, France. 

She began doctoral studies in comparative literature at the University of Indiana before changing course after students expressed that they got most of their information from television. She enrolled in a journalism program at Columbia University in 1973 and was hired as a news writer in by WBBM the same year.

Career
In 1967, after completing her undergraduate studies, Poussaint danced with the Jean Leon Destine Haitian Dance Company. She edited the Los Angeles Based  African Arts Magazine from 1969-1973 and worked as a translator at the University of California in 1970.

Poussaint's broadcast career started in 1970 in Chicago. She began working at a Washington corresponding for CBS News in the mid-1979s and was hired in 1978 by WJLA-TV as a evening and late-night news co-anchor. In the early 1980s she worked at CBS 2, anchoring the lunch hour program Channel 2: The People. Poussaint would go on to  anchored the ABC Evening News, often sitting in for Peter Jennings, and appeared in news segments on Good Morning America.

In 2001 Poussaint founded the National Visionary Leadership Project in 2001 with Camille Cosby. Funded by Camille and husband Bill Cosby, the oral history project interviewed Black elders 70 years of age and older. Included among the interviewees were Maya Angelou, Roscoe Lee Browne, Shirley Chisholm, and Katherine Dunham. Some of the interviews compiled by the organization were featured in the book A Wealth of Wisdom: Legendary African American Elders Speak, which was co-edited by Poussaint and Camille Cosby.

Poussaint was also the founder of her own non-profit documentary company, Wisdom Works, which produced Tutu and Franklin: A Journey Towards Peace which examined racial reconciliation with South African Archbishop Desmond Tutu and American historian John Hope Franklin.

Later in life Poussaint taught at the University of Maryland's Philip Merrill College of Journalism.

Awards

Poussaint won three Emmy Awards over the course of her career. She was recognized for reporting  about Haitian migrant workers at a labor camp on Maryland’s Eastern Shore, an account of the return of the American hostages from Iran, and a profile about Washington Commanders owner Jack Kent Cooke.

Death

Poussaint died of lung cancer on March 4, 2022, at her home in D.C. A service in her honor was held at the Plymouth Congregational United Church of Christ.

Publications

References

African-American journalists
American women television journalists
American television reporters and correspondents
Sarah Lawrence College alumni
University of California, Los Angeles alumni
1944 births
2022 deaths